WTSS (102.5 FM) is a commercial radio station in Buffalo, New York, branded as Star 102.5. It airs a hot adult contemporary radio format, switching to Christmas music for much of November and December.  It is owned and operated by Audacy, Inc.  The studios and offices are on Corporate Parkway in Amherst, New York.

WTSS is grandfathered as a “superpower” station, with an effective radiated power (ERP) of 110,000 watts, more than double of most Buffalo FM stations.  The transmitter is on Center Street in Colden, New York, on the WIVB-TV Tower.

History
The owner of AM station WBEN, WBEN, Inc. (a subsidiary of the Buffalo Evening News) as of October 13, 1931, had experimented with higher-frequency broadcasts for over a decade prior to launch of the station that would become WTSS. It had operated W8XH, an Apex band station, from 1934 to 1939. Like the standard broadcast band stations of the time, W8XH transmitted using amplitude modulation (AM); it was the first Apex station to operate on a regular schedule. That station converted to facsimile broadcasting as W8XA in 1939 before shutting down in December 1940.

The Federal Communications Commission issued a construction permit to WBEN, Inc. for a new FM station on 43.3 MHz on the original 42-50 MHz FM Broadcast Band on August 10, 1944 with the  WBEN-FM call sign. The FCC reassigned the station to 92.1 MHz in August 1946 after it created the current FM Broadcast Band on June 27, 1945. The station made its broadcast debut on November 11, 1946.

The station was subsequently reassigned by the FCC to 106.5 MHz in 1947, and mostly simulcast its AM counterpart. The FCC granted the station its first license on January 7, 1953, followed by a reassignment to 102.5 MHz in July 1958. It ceased simulcasting WBEN (AM) a few years later, with the exception of the Clint Buehlman morning show, which it carried until 1973. WBEN-FM aired a mixture of live and automated music, mostly easy listening and block music programming, such as organ music. As FM listening grew, the station became "Rock 102" in 1973, using the syndicated TM "Stereo Rock" automated contemporary hits format and dropping the morning show simulcast with WBEN. This same TM format and its prerecorded announcer were heard on other stations in Upstate New York during this period, including WGFM (now WRVE) in Schenectady/Albany, WYUT (now WXUR) in Herkimer (Utica-Rome), WKFM (now WBBS) in Fulton/Syracuse, WNOZ (now WIII) in Cortland/Ithaca and WPXY (FM) in Rochester.

WBEN-AM-FM were sold to Algonquin Broadcasting effective March 1, 1978. Beginning in 1984, Rock 102's mornings were hosted live by Roger Christian, who had been with the station since 1976 and in Buffalo radio since 1964. (This Roger Christian, whose real name is Emerson Stevens, is not to be confused with the Buffalo-born disc jockey also known as Roger Christian, who was known as "Mike Melody" in Buffalo. Stevens may have chosen the name in honor of the real Roger Christian, who went on to a prolific career in radio and songwriting.) Christian remained with the station, most recently as midday host, until Entercom eliminated his position in September 2019.

In 1987, the station shifted to a fully live format with the WMJQ call sign.  WMJQ was originally branded as "Majic 102" and later "Q102". The Q102 moniker remained until the late 1990s. As "Majic 102", the station competed heavily with 98.5 WKSE for Buffalo's Top 40 audience in the late 1980s and early 1990s before shifting to its current Hot AC format in September 1991.  The "Star" moniker and WTSS call sign were adopted in 2000, shortly after Entercom purchased the station in 1999 from the Sinclair Broadcast Group, which was exiting radio to focus on its television holdings.

The station has, since 1973, been a pop music (Hot Adult Contemporary or Adult Top 40) outlet geared toward a female audience. It has varied in its presentation during that time depending on the formats of other stations. For instance, much of the mid-to-late 2000s, WTSS' playlist included music as early as the 1970s in an effort to serve listeners when Buffalo did not have an oldies station. It changed to its current formula after longtime oldies/classic hits outlet WHTT-FM returned to the format. The music on WTSS today is mostly upbeat hits from 2000 to the present, minus any hard rock or rap.

In 2006, WTSS began streaming its programming on the Internet. WTSS was nominated for Hot AC Station of the Year by Radio & Records Magazine in 2006 and 2007. WTSS became Buffalo's only hot AC radio station following CFLZ-FM's flip from hot AC to adult hits in August 2011.

Programming and playlists
On weekdays, Rob Lucas hosts morning drive time and Sue O'Neill is heard in afternoons. Mike McQueen is heard on weekends.

Every holiday season, Star switches to the moniker "Buffalo's Christmas Station" and plays all Christmas music. When it began this practice in 2001, it typically began the all-Christmas format in late November and ended it promptly at midnight on December 26. It slowly began progressing the launch date earlier and earlier in the 2010s until reaching November 1 in 2019, a date that WTSS has settled on ever since, making it one of the earliest adopters of the format in the United States each year; since 2018, it has continued its all-Christmas format for several days after the holiday, tapering off until New Year's Day. WTSS is temporarily delisted from Mediabase's Hot AC panel when the station goes all-Christmas. To compensate for the extended period of Christmas music, the station adjusts the playlist over the course of the season, with Christmas novelty songs being held back until later in the season to avoid listener fatigue.

News and traffic are provided from sister station 930 WBEN and weather is provided by television station WGRZ. These information elements are heard near the bottom of each hour during the morning show.

Broadcast signal/Canadian listenership

WTSS is a grandfathered “superpower” station. The station’s effective radiated power (ERP) exceeds the maximum limit allowed for a Class B FM station, and is also far above the maximum allowable ERP for its antenna height above average terrain (HAAT) according to current FCC rules.

WTSS and WDCX-FM have the strongest FM signals in Western New York, both broadcasting with 110,000 watts, although WTSS has a much taller tower.  Sharing the tower of former sister station WBEN-TV (now WIVB), the station's transmitter is located on a high ridge in the Allegheny Plateau, 20 miles southeast of Buffalo, near Colden, New York.  WTSS can be heard in the Rochester metropolitan area, although some adjacent channel interference is picked up from WVOR (102.3 MHz) and WLGZ-FM (102.7 MHz).  WTSS's signal also extends across the Pennsylvania state line, around Allegheny State Park, as well as parts of Erie County, Pennsylvania, although adjacent channel interference exists at 102.3 MHz from classic rock station WQHZ in and west of the city of Erie, also where co-channel interference with WZOO in Ashtabula, Ohio (also at 102.5 MHz) begins.

WTSS can also be heard in parts of the Greater Toronto Area, where the signal crosses Lake Ontario. At times during the station's history, before the FM band became more crowded (and especially during its run as "Rock 102"), it performed as a top-10 rated station in Toronto. Other Buffalo area radio stations with strong signals and in formats not available in Canada at the time, such as WGR, WKSE, and WBLK, were also highly rated in Toronto.

HD Radio and Translator
In 2006, WTSS began offering an HD2 channel called "The Delta", which featured Delta blues music. As of May 11, 2015, the HD2 channel is a simulcast of co-owned alternative rock (now country) station WLKK.  The HD2 channel feeds an FM translator in Buffalo, W284AP at 104.7 MHz. WLKK's transmitter is in Wethersfield, New York, making reception difficult in some parts of Buffalo, so the HD2 channel and translator are alternatives for WLKK listeners.

An HD3 channel had broadcast Family Life Network, a Christian radio network, primarily to serve as an originating station for FLN's translators (Townsquare Media station WBUF now serves that purpose).  In October 2019, the HD3 channel switched to Channel Q, an Entercom service for LGBTQ listeners, featuring talk shows on weekdays and dance music nights and weekends.

References

External links

FCC History Cards for WTSS (covering WBEN-FM for 1946-1981)
List of "Grandfathered Superpower" FM stations

Hot adult contemporary radio stations in the United States
TSS
Radio stations established in 1946
Audacy, Inc. radio stations